Nonlabens spongiae is a Gram-negative, strictly aerobic, rod-shaped and motile bacterium from the genus of Nonlabens which has been isolated from a marine sponge from the Bahamas.

References

Flavobacteria
Bacteria described in 2006